Caden Kelly (born 20 November 2003) is an English professional footballer who plays as a midfielder for Sunderland.

Club career
Born in Manchester England. Kelly was raised in Manchester. He started his career with Manchester City, spending ten years before a stint in the academy of Salford City. After a brief period with the Football Flick Academy, he signed for Sunderland. He signed his first professional contract with Sunderland in July 2022.

Career statistics
.

References

2003 births
Living people
Irish people of English descent
Republic of Ireland association footballers
Association football midfielders
Manchester City F.C. players
Salford City F.C. players
Sunderland A.F.C. players